Fanconi anemia, complementation group M, also known as FANCM is a human gene. It is an emerging target in cancer therapy, in particular cancers with specific genetic deficiencies.

Function 
The protein encoded by this gene, FANCM displays DNA binding against fork structures and an ATPase activity associated with DNA branch migration. It is believed that FANCM in conjunction with other Fanconi anemia- proteins repair DNA at stalled replication forks, and stalled transcription structures called R-loops.

The structure of the C-terminus of FANCM (amino acids 1799-2048), bound to a partner protein FAAP24, reveals how the protein complex recognises branched DNA. A structure of amino acids 675-790 of FANCM reveal how the protein binds duplex DNA through a remodeling of the MHF1:MHF2 histone-like protein complex.

Disease association
Bi-allelic mutations in the FANCM gene were originally associated with Fanconi anemia, although several individuals with FANCM deficiency do not appear to have the disorder. Mono-allelic FANCM mutations are associated with breast cancer risk and especially with risk of developing ER-negative and TNBC disease subtypes. A founder mutation in the Scandinavian population is also associated with a higher than average frequency of triple negative breast cancer in heterozygous carriers. FANCM carriers also have elevated levels of Ovarian cancer and other solid tumours

FANCM as a therapeutic target in ALT cancer

Expression and activity of FANCM, is essential for the viability of cancers using Alternative Lengthening of Telomeres (ALT-associated cancers). Several other synthetic lethal interactions have been observed for FANCM that may widen the targetability of the protein in therapeutic use.

There are several potential ways in which FANCM activity could be targeted as an anti-cancer agent. In the context of ALT, one of the best targets may be a peptide domain of FANCM called MM2. Ectopic MM2 peptide (that acts as a dominant decoy) was sufficient to inhibit colony formation of ALT-associated cancer cells, but not telomerase-positive cancer cells. This peptide works as a dominant interfering binder to RMI1:RMI2, and sequesters another DNA repair complex called the Bloom Syndrome complex away from FANCM. As with FANCM depletion, this induces death through a “hyper-ALT” phenotype. An in vitro high-throughput screen for small molecule inhibitors of MM2-RMI1:2 interaction lead to the discovery of PIP-199. This experimental drug also showed some discriminatory activity in killing of ALT-cells, compared to telomerase-positive cells.

Meiosis

Recombination during meiosis is often initiated by a DNA double-strand break (DSB). During recombination, sections of DNA at the 5' ends of the break are cut away in a process called resection. In the strand invasion step that follows, an overhanging 3' end of the broken DNA molecule then "invades" the DNA of a homologous chromosome that is not broken forming a displacement loop (D-loop). After strand invasion, the further sequence of events may follow either of two main pathways leading to a crossover (CO) or a non-crossover (NCO) recombinant (see Genetic recombination and Homologous recombination).  The pathway leading to a NCO is referred to as synthesis dependent strand annealing (SDSA).

In the plant Arabidopsis thaliana FANCM helicase antagonizes the formation of CO recombinants during meiosis, thus favoring NCO recombinants.  The FANCM helicase is required for genome stability in humans and yeast, and is a major factor limiting meiotic CO formation in A. thaliana.  A pathway involving another helicase, RECQ4A/B, also acts independently of FANCM to reduce CO recombination.  These two pathways likely act by unwinding different joint molecule substrates (e.g. nascent versus extended D-loops; see Figure).

Only about 4% of DSBs in A. thaliana are repaired by CO recombination; the remaining 96% are likely repaired mainly by NCO recombination.  Sequela-Arnaud et al. suggested that CO numbers are restricted because of the long-term costs of CO recombination, that is, the breaking up of favorable genetic combinations of alleles built up by past natural selection.

In the fission yeast Schizosaccharomyces pombe, FANCM helicase also directs NCO recombination during meiosis.

References

External links 
 

Human proteins